John McDonogh (1941 - 12 September 2012) was an Irish hurler who played as full-back for the Limerick senior team.

Born in Ballysimon, Limerick, McDonogh first arrived on the inter-county scene at the age of sixteen when he first linked up with the Limerick minor team. He joined the senior panel during the 1963 championship. McDonogh was a regular member of the team over the next few years, however, he ended his career without any major success.

At club level McDonogh hurling and Gaelic football with St. Patrick's.

McDonogh's son, Stephen, also played with Limerick.

Throughout his career McDonogh made 9 championship appearances. His retirement came following the conclusion of the 1970 championship.

Honours

Team

Limerick
All-Ireland Minor Hurling Championship (1): 1958
Munster Minor Hurling Championship (1): 1958

References

1941 births
2012 deaths
Hurling backs
Irish farmers
Limerick inter-county hurlers
St Patrick's (Limerick) hurlers